Chen Mingren (7 April 1903 – 21 May 1974) was a prominent military figure from Liling, Hunan Province and one of the founding members of the People's Liberation Army. He was a top level military commander in the Republic of China. He then joined Communist China in 1949. Chen was awarded with the rank of General in 1955.

Biography

Early Years

Chen was born into family of farmers in Hunan on 7 April 1903. He went through his education in private institutions and underwent military training in 1924. On 19 November 1924, he was transferred to the Whampoa Military Academy. Upon his graduation and stellar military performance during the Northern Expedition, he rose through the ranks quickly. By 1928, he was a colonel in the National Revolutionary Army.

He was the general of the 24th Revolutionary Army (ROC) during the Central Plains War whom led a Pyrrhic victory against Shi Yousan. He was appointed as the 88th Division commander in 1932 and led the Republican Armies against the Communist Party of China's Chinese Red Army in Jiangxi and Fujian during the Encirclement Campaigns. Following his defeat to the Communists in 1934 at Shaxian County, Chen was transferred to the Lushan Military Academy. Upon his graduation and the trust he had over Chiang Kai-shek, he was appointed into the Republican Senate for military affairs and became the Director of the Guomindang Military Department.

Sino-Japanese and Chinese Civil War
After the outbreak of the Second Sino-Japanese War in 1937, Chen was appointed as a Lieutenant-General in the 2nd Army Division (reserve division). Between 1937-1939, he held key positions such as being the commander of the Changsha, Hengyang, Hengyang, Leiyang garrisons. In the winter of 1941, he was appointed as the deputy commander of the 71st ROC Army.

In 1946, the 71st Army was transported by US warships to the Northeast in preparation for the anticipated Chinese Civil War. With the start of the Summer Offensive of 1947 in Northeast China by Communist general Lin Biao, Chen's 71st Army was forced to retreat to and rendezvous at Siping, Jilin. Mustering local forces and his own army, he had around 30 thousand man waiting from reinforcements.

Between 22 May to 30 June 1947, Chen was able to repel the Chinese Red Army in Northeast China that was led by Li Tianyou. In June, he was able to resist the overwhelming forces under the command of Lin Biao at Siping Street for more than 40 days. For his gallant efforts, he was awarded with the Order of Blue Sky and White Sun and was promoted to the 7th Corps Commander. Although successful in the initial stages of the Siping Campaign, the Communist forces whom surrounded the stronghold managed to break the Nationalist defenses following a 9-month long assault.

At the eve of the Huaihai Campaign, Bai Chongxi recommended Chen Mingren to Chiang Kai-shek as the garrison commander of Wuhan. Chen transferred to his Wuhuan office in October 1948 was concurrently the commander of the 29th Nationalist Army. He became the First Corps Commander and the provincial chairman of the Hunan Provincial Government.

After the establishment of the People's Republic of China
On 4 August 1949, Chen and Cheng Qian joined the Communists at Changsha. After being encouraged by Mao Zedong and Zhou Enlai to continue his military service, he joined the People's Liberation Army.

References

1903 births
1974 deaths
People of the Central Plains War
Chinese Communist Party politicians from Hunan
Chinese people of World War II
People of the Northern Expedition
People of the Chinese Civil War
People from Liling
Politicians from Zhuzhou
People's Liberation Army generals from Hunan
Republic of China people who surrendered to the Chinese Communist Party
Burials at Babaoshan Revolutionary Cemetery